Mullinavat GAA is a Gaelic Athletic Association club located in Mullinavat, County Kilkenny, Ireland. The club was founded in 1913 and fields teams in both hurling and Gaelic football.

Honours
 Leinster Intermediate Club Hurling Championship: (1) 2014
 Leinster Intermediate Club Football Championship: Runners-Up 2019
 Kilkenny Senior Club Football Championship (5): 2007, 2017, 2018, 2019, 2020
 Kilkenny Intermediate Club Hurling Championship (4): 1989, 2001, 2007, 2014
 Kilkenny Junior Hurling Championship (4) 1915, 1916, 1939, 1984
 Kilkenny Under-21 A Hurling Championship (1): 2013
 Kilkenny Minor A Hurling Championship: (1) 1939

References

External links
 Mullinavat GAA website

Gaelic games clubs in County Kilkenny
Hurling clubs in County Kilkenny
Gaelic football clubs in County Kilkenny
1913 establishments in Ireland